Bulldog Courage may refer to:

Bulldog Courage (1922 film), a silent Western film starring George Larkin and Bessie Love
Bulldog Courage (1935 film), a Western film starring Tim McCoy
Bulldog Courage, a hardcore band from Albany, New York